Black Miracle is an album by saxophonist Joe Henderson which was recorded in 1975 and released on the Milestone label in 1976. Musicians include keyboardist George Duke, guitarist Lee Ritenour, bassist Ron Carter, drummer Harvey Mason and a brass section.

Reception

Vincent Thomas of Allmusic said "Black Miracle was a decidedly softer album with enough pop elements to make it (dare it be said) "easy listening" for a wide range of jazz heads".

Track listing 
All compositions by Joe Henderson except as indicated
 "Solution" - 7:05
 "My Cherie Amour" (Henry Cosby, Stevie Wonder, Sylvia Moy) - 6:44
 "Gazelle" - 5:23
 "Black Miracle" - 9:34
 "Immaculate Deception" - 4:12
 "Old Slippers" (George Duke) - 5:59

Personnel 
Joe Henderson - tenor saxophone
Oscar Brashear, Snooky Young - trumpet, flugelhorn
George Bohanon - trombone
Don Waldrop - bass trombone, tuba
Hadley Caliman - flute, tenor saxophone
Dawilli Gonga - electric piano, clavinet, synthesizer
Lee Ritenour - guitar
Ron Carter - electric bass
Harvey Mason - drums
Bill Summers - percussion

References 

Joe Henderson albums
1976 albums
Milestone Records albums
Albums produced by Orrin Keepnews